{{speciesbox
| image = Acianthera crinita.jpg
| genus = Acianthera
| species = crinita
| authority =  (Barb.Rodr.) Pridgeon & M.W. Chase (2001)
| synonyms =
  Pleurothallis crinita Barb.Rodr. (1877) (Basionym)
 Lepanthes crinita (Barb.Rodr.) Barb.Rodr. (1881)
 Lepanthes renipetala Barb.Rodr. (1881)
 Pleurothallis renipetala (Barb.Rodr.) Cogn. (1896)
 Pleurothallis renipetala var. grandifolia Cogn. (1896)
 Pleurothallis renipetala var. intermedia Cogn. (1896)
 Cryptophoranthus kautskyi Pabst (1976)
 Specklinia crinita (Barb.Rodr.) F. Barros (1983)
 Acianthera renipetala (Barb.Rodr.) Luer (2004)
}}Acianthera crinita'' is a species of orchid.

References

External links

crinita